Kamila Lićwinko (née Stepaniuk; born 22 March 1986) is a Polish retired track and field athlete who specialized in the high jump.

International
Her personal bests in the event are 1.99 metres outdoors (2013, 2015, 2016) and 2.02 metres indoors (2015). Both are current Polish national records. She won the gold medal at the 2014 World Indoor Championship ex aequo with Mariya Kuchina.

In 2015, the Pole finished 4th at the World Championships with a 1.99 m's jump, equalling her own-shared national record. Mariya Kuchina of Russia took the gold (2.01 m), Croatia's Blanka Vlasic the silver (2.01 m) and Kuchina's compatriot Anna Chicherova the bronze (2.01 m).

In March 2016, she could not retain her world indoor title, taking the bronze medal on countback in Portland behind Vashti Cunningham (gold) and Ruth Beitia (silver). On June 18, Kamila Lićwinko jumped a new World Lead of 1.99 m (=NR) in Szczecin, before failing three time at 2.01 m.

As the captain of the Polish team, she received the gold medal at 2021 European Athletics Team Championships.

Competition record

Personal life
In 2013 she married Michał Lićwinko, who is also her coach. On February 12, 2015, she was awarded the Golden Cross of Merit by President Bronisław Komorowski. In February 2018 she announced her career suspension because of pregnancy.

State awards
 2015  Gold Cross of Merit

References

External links

1986 births
Living people
People from Bielsk Podlaski
Sportspeople from Podlaskie Voivodeship
Polish female high jumpers
World Athletics Championships athletes for Poland
World Athletics Championships medalists
Athletes (track and field) at the 2016 Summer Olympics
Olympic athletes of Poland
Universiade medalists in athletics (track and field)
Podlasie Białystok athletes
Universiade gold medalists for Poland
World Athletics Indoor Championships winners
Competitors at the 2009 Summer Universiade
Medalists at the 2013 Summer Universiade
Athletes (track and field) at the 2020 Summer Olympics